Niña Dolino (born October 26, 1982) is a Filipino actress.

Filmography

Television

Film

References

External links
 

Star Magic
Actresses from Cebu
Filipino film actresses
Filipino television actresses
1982 births
Living people
21st-century Filipino actresses